Fayez Jumaa (Arabic:فايز جمعه) (born 12 February 1981) is an Emirati footballer. He currently plays as a defender .

Club career

2014-15 Sharjah Cultural Sports Club: Tournament:Division 1, Games:8, Yellow cards:1
2015-16 Sharjah Cultural Sports Club: Tournament:Division 1, Games:20, Yellow cards:3
2016-17 Sharjah Cultural Sports Club: Tournament:Division 1, Games:12, Yellow cards:4, Red cards:1

External links

References

Emirati footballers
1981 births
Living people
Sharjah FC players
Al-Arabi SC (UAE) players
Footballers at the 2002 Asian Games
UAE Pro League players
UAE First Division League players
Association football defenders
Asian Games competitors for the United Arab Emirates